Jalat Khan (born 3 February 1986, is a Pakistani cricketer from Kachi District, Balochistan, Pakistan. He was part of the bronze-medal-winning team at the 2010 Asian Games in Guangzhou, China.

Career
Khan made his first-class debut in 2003/2004, and his list A debut in 2002/2003. Amongst the teams he has played for are: Balochistan Bears, Pakistan Customs, Quetta Bears, Sibi Cricket Association and State Bank of Pakistan.

In November 2010, Khan was part of the team at the Asian Games in Guangzhou, China, which won a bronze medal by beating Sri Lanka in the 3rd place playoffs.

In January 2021, he was named in Balochistan's squad for the 2020–21 Pakistan Cup.

References

1986 births
Living people
People from Kachhi District
Pakistani cricketers
Cricketers at the 2010 Asian Games
Asian Games bronze medalists for Pakistan
Asian Games medalists in cricket
Pakistan Customs cricketers
Baluchistan cricketers
Quetta Bears cricketers
Quetta Gladiators cricketers
State Bank of Pakistan cricketers
Quetta cricketers
Baluchistan Bears cricketers
Mashonaland Eagles cricketers
Nugegoda Sports and Welfare Club cricketers
Medalists at the 2010 Asian Games